The 2008 UEFA Women's Under-17 Championship was the first edition of the UEFA Women's Under-17 Championship. Germany won the trophy for the first time ever.

Qualification
There were two qualifying rounds, and four teams qualified for the final round, played in Switzerland.

First qualifying round
There were ten groups of four teams each. The ten group winners and best six runners-up advanced to the second qualifying round.

Teams in italics hosted the mini-tournament.

Group 1

Group 2

Group 3

Group 4

Group 5

Group 6

Group 7

Group 8

Group 9

Group 10

Ranking of group runners-up
Only matches against 1st and 3rd placed teams were used in the ranking.

Second qualifying round
The sixteen qualified teams from the first qualifying round were allocated in four groups of four teams each. The group winners advanced to the final round.

Teams in italics hosted the mini-tournament.

Group 1

Group 2

Group 3

Group 4

Final tournament

The knockout stage was played in Switzerland. The four teams qualified to the 2008 FIFA U-17 Women's World Cup held in New Zealand.

External links
RSSSF.com – results

UEFA Women's Under-17 Championship
UEfa
Uefa under-17 women's championship
International women's association football competitions hosted by Switzerland
UEFA
2008 in youth sport
May 2008 sports events in Europe
2008 in youth association football